Fernandocrambus grisea is a moth in the family Crambidae. It was described by John Frederick Gates Clarke in 1965, and is found in Chile.

References

Crambini
Moths described in 1965
Moths of South America
Endemic fauna of Chile